National Highway 966B, also known as NH 966B, is part of India's National Highway network. Its old name was NH 47A. It starts from the junction of NH 66 at Kundannoor.

See also
 List of National Highways in India by highway number
 List of National Highways in India by state
 National Highways Development Project
Smallest National Highway in india is NH 766EE (4.27km),Hattikeri to Belekeri port (in Karnataka)

References

External links
 About NH 966B
 Road Transport in Kerala
 NH network map of India

National highways in India
966B
Roads in Kochi